Derrick D'wayne Burroughs (born May 18, 1962) is an American football coach and former cornerback who played five seasons in the National Football League (NFL) for the Buffalo Bills. He served two stints as the head football coach at Lane College, from 2010 to 2013 and 2015 to 2019.

Coaching career
Burroughs began his coaching career in 1995 as assistant head coach and defensive coordinator for Knoxville College. Three years later, he joined the Amsterdam Admirals of NFL Europe in the role of running backs coach. Burroughs became the defensive backs coach of the Berlin Thunder in 1999. He served in a similar capacity with the Los Angeles Avengers of the Arena Football League (2000) and Memphis Maniax of the XFL (2001). After four years in private business he returned to coaching in 2006 as defensive coordinator and defensive backs coach at Clark Atlanta. In 2007, he was the defensive backs coach at Stillman College. Burroughs spent 2008 in the same role at Alabama State University. On February 6, 2010, Burroughs became the head football coach at Lane College. He returned to Lane in 2015 after a one-year stint at Jackson State University.

Head coaching record

References

External links
 Lane profile

1962 births
Living people
American football cornerbacks
Alabama State Hornets football coaches
Amsterdam Admirals coaches
Berlin Thunder coaches
Buffalo Bills players
Clark Atlanta Panthers football coaches
Jackson State Tigers football coaches
Knoxville Bulldogs football coaches
Lane Dragons football coaches
Los Angeles Avengers coaches
Memphis Maniax coaches
Memphis Tigers football players
New York Sentinels coaches
Stillman Tigers football coaches
Sportspeople from Mobile, Alabama
Coaches of American football from Alabama
Players of American football from Alabama
African-American coaches of American football
African-American players of American football
20th-century African-American sportspeople
21st-century African-American people